The 506th Air Refueling Squadron is an inactive United States Air Force unit. It was last assigned to the 42d Air Division at Bergstrom Air Force Base, Texas where it was inactivated on 1 July 1957 and its personnel and equipment transferred to the 92d Air Refueling Squadron.

The Squadron was first activated as the 406th Fighter Squadron in 1943, one of the original squadrons of the 371st Fighter Group.  The squadron saw combat in the European theater of World War II before being inactivated in 1945, earning a Distinguished Unit Citation for its attacks in March 1945 that contributed to the defeat of Axis forces in southern Germany.

The 506th Air Refueling Squadron was established in 1953 by Strategic Air Command (SAC) at Dow Air Force Base, Maine and equipped with rigid flying boom KB-29P Superfortress tankers. The squadron mission was to provide in-flight refueling for its parent wing and other USAF units.  It moved to Bergstrom in 1955 and was inactivated there when SAC transferred its fighter force to Tactical Air Command.

History

World War II
The 406th Fighter Squadron was activated ar Richmond Army Air Base, Virginia in the summer of 1943 as one of the three original squadrons of the 371st Fighter Group.  The squadron trained in the northeastern United States with Republic P-47 Thunderbolts under First Air Force before moving overseas in the spring of 1944.

Upon arriving in England, the squadron became an element of Ninth Air Force at Bisterne Close, England.  The squadron's first combat operation was a fighter sweep over Occupied France. Prior to Operation Overlord, the invasion of Normandy, the 406th flew fighter sweeps, dive bombing and escort missions.

On D-Day the 406th patrolled the beachhead. attacking railroads, trains, vehicles. gun emplacements and other targets.  Soon after the invasion, the squadron moved to France and participated in the air interdiction that preceded the Allied breakout at St Lo in late July and supported the following drive across northern France.  It continued to operate in northeastern France and southwestern Germany through the winter of 1945, attacking storage dumps, marshalling yard, factories, bridges, roads, and vehicles.  In December 1944 it provided close air support for ground forces engaged in the Battle of the Bulge.

The squadron was awarded a Distinguished Unit Citation for its attacks between 15 and 21 March 1945 that contributed to the defeat of Axis forces in southern Germany.  It continued combat operations until the Surrender of Germany in May. The squadron remained with the occupation forces in Germany until October 1945 when it returned to the United States and was inactivated.

Cold War
The 506th Air Refueling Squadron was established on 25 September 1953 by Strategic Air Command (SAC) at Dow AFB and initially equipped with rigid flying boom KB-29P Superfortress tankers. Its mission was to provide in-flight refueling to the Republic F-84 Thunderjet strategic fighters of its parent wing.  The squadron also supported other USAF units as directed.  In 1954 the squadron deployed to Kindley Air Force Base, Bermuda to support SAC fighters of the 508th Strategic Fighter Wing.

In 1955 SAC concentrated its strategic fighter units, and the 506th's parent 506th Strategic Fighter Wing moved to Tinker Air Force Base, Oklahoma in March.  The squadron remained at Dow and was reassigned to the 4060th Air Refueling Wing until August, when it moved to Bergstrom Air Force Base, Texas, where it was assigned to the 42d Air Division, the parent of the 12th Strategic Fighter Wing, to which the squadron was attached.

The 506th was inactivated at Bergstrom on 1 July 1957 and its mission, personnel, and equipment were transferred to the 92d Air Refueling Squadron, which was activated that same day to assume SAC resources at Bergstrom as the 42d Air Division and SAC fighter organizations were transferred to Tactical Air Command.

The 406th Fighter Squadron and the 506th Air Refueling Squadron were consolidated in 1985, but the consolidated unit has not been active.

Lineage

406th Fighter Squadron
 Constituted as the 406th Fighter Squadron, Single Engine on 15 May 1943
 Activated on 15 July 1943
 Inactivated on 10 November 1945
 Consolidated on 19 September 1985 with the 506th Air Refueling Squadron as the 506th Air Refueling Squadron

506th Air Refueling Squadron
 Constituted as the 506th Air Refueling Squadron, Medium and activated on 25 September 1953
 Inactivated on 1 July 1957
 Consolidated on 19 September 1985 with the 406th Fighter Squadron as the 506th Air Refueling Squadron, Heavy (remained inactive)
 Redeignated 506th Expeditionary Air Refueling Squadron and converted to provisional status on 12 June 2002

Assignments
 371st Fighter Group: 15 July 1943 – 10 November 1945
 506th Strategic Fighter Wing: 25 September 1953
 4060th Air Refueling Wing: 1 March 1955
 42d Air Division: 15 August 1955 – 1 July 1957 (attached to 12th Strategic Fighter Wing)
 Air Mobility Command to activate or inactivate as needed, 12 June 2002

Stations

 Richmond Army Air Base, Virginia, 15 July 1943
 Camp Springs Army Air Field, 2 October 1943
 Millville Army Air Field, 17 November 1943
 Camp Springs Army Air Field, 12 December 1943
 Richmond Army Air Base, Virginia, 20 January 1944 – 14 February 1944
 Bisterne Close, England, (Station 415), 7 March 1944
 Beuzeville Airfield, France (A-6), ca. 17 June 1944
 Perthes Airfield, France (A-65), ca. 20 September 1944
 Dôle-Tavaux Airfield, France (Y-7), 1 October 1944

 Tantonville Airfield, France (Y-1), 29 December 1944
 Metz-Frescaty Airfield, France (Y-34), 15 February 1945
 Frankfurt-Eschborn Airfield, Germany (Y-74), ca. 3 May 1945
 Fürth-Atzendorf Airfield, Germany (R-28), ca 5 April 1945
 Hörsching Airfield, Austria (R-87), 16 August 1945
 Stuttgart, Germany, ca. 13 September 1945 – October 1945
 Camp Shanks, New York, 9 November 1945 – 10 November 1945
 Dow Air Force Base, Maine 25 September 1953
 Bergstrom Air Force Base, Texas, 15 August 1955 – 1 July 1957

Aircraft
 Republic P-47 Thunderbolt, 1943–1945
 Boeing KB-29 Superfortress, 1953-unknown
 Boeing KC-97 Stratotanker, unknown-1957

Awards and campaigns

 406th Fighter Squadron cited in the Order of the Day, Belgian Army for the period 6 June 1944 – 30 September 1944

References

Notes

Bibliography

 
 
 
 
 
 
 

Air refueling squadrons of the United States Air Force